Ficus depressa is a banyan fig species in the family Moraceae.  No subspecies are listed in the Catalogue of Life.  The species can be found in Indo-China and Malesia.  In Vietnam it may be called sung xoài or đa nước.

References

External links 
 
 

depressa
Trees of Vietnam
Flora of Indo-China
Flora of Malesia